The 1916 Auburn Tigers football team represented Auburn University in the 1916 college football season. It was the Tigers' 25th overall season and they competed as a member of the Southern Intercollegiate Athletic Association (SIAA). The team was led by head coach Mike Donahue, in his 12th year, and played their home games at Drake Field in Auburn, Alabama. They finished with a record of six wins and two losses (6–2 overall, 6–2 in the SIAA).

Schedule

Season summary

Georgia

In the 1916 game against Georgia, Moon Ducote kicked a 40-yard field goal from placement off of captain Lucy Hairston's football helmet in the fourth quarter and in the mud, which proved the only points in the 3–0 Auburn victory. The maneuver prompted a rule that stated the ball must be kicked directly off the ground. Parke H. Davis described it thus:Ducote falls back to try for a goal from the field. Hairston removes his leather helmet and places it upon the ground. He creases the top of the helmet and sights it for the goal. Spectators curiously watch the proceedings. Suddenly, the ball is passed. Hairston receives it, places it on the helmet, which all suddenly see it is to serve as a mechanical tee. Ducote leaps forward, kicks the ball from the top of the helmet and drives it straight as an arrow for Georgia's crossbar, over which it sails evenly between the posts."

Florida

Sources:

The Tigers beat the winless Florida Gators 20–0. Auburn's fullback Scott was the star of the contest. The second touchdown was a 50-yard interception return by Godwin.

The starting lineup was Jones (left end), Bonner (left tackle), Fricke (left guard), Goodwin (center), Campbell (right guard), Steed (right tackle), Burns (right end), Hairston (quarterback), Ducote (left halfback), Pendergast (right halfback), Scott (fullback).

Vanderbilt

Sources:

Dan McGugin's Vanderbilt Commodores eliminated Auburn from SIAA title contention by a 20–9 score. Josh Cody carried the ball over for the first touchdown. Rabbit Curry played well at the start, but could not play the entire game due to an ankle injury. Moon Ducote made a 45-yard field goal in the third quarter to put the Tigers up 9–7. With the help of the forward pass, the Commodores scored two further touchdowns in the last quarter.

The starting lineup was C. Jones (left end), Sample (left tackle), Frickie (left guard), Robinson (center), Campbell (right guard), Bonner (right tackle), Steed (right end), Hairston (quarterback), Ducote (left halfback), Prendergast (right halfback), Scott (fullback).

Georgia Tech

Sources:

John Heisman's Georgia Tech overwhelmed rival Auburn 33–7 to clinch a share of the SIAA title. Tech end Dunwoody scored a touchdown when he recovered a fumble and raced 20 yards. Center Pup Phillips also had a score, falling on a punt he blocked. Auburn's star was Moon Ducote.

The starting lineup was C. Jones (left end), Sample (left tackle), Frickey (left guard), Robinson (center), Campbell (right guard), Ducote (right tackle), Steed (right end), T. Jones (quarterback),  Hairston (left halfback),  Prendergast (right halfback), Scott (fullback).

References

Auburn
Auburn Tigers football seasons
Auburn Tigers football